Denis Healy was an Irish politician.  He was a Fianna Fáil member of the Seanad Éireann from 1934 to 1936, and 1938 to 1948. He was elected to the Free State Seanad in 1934 for 9 years and served until it was abolished in 1936. He was elected to the 3rd Seanad in 1938 on the Administrative Panel and was re-elected at the 1943 and 1944 elections.

References

Year of birth missing
Year of death missing
Fianna Fáil senators
Members of the 1931 Seanad
Members of the 3rd Seanad
Members of the 4th Seanad
Members of the 5th Seanad